Gomguk, gomtang, or beef bone soup refers to a soup in Korean cuisine made with various beef parts such as ribs, oxtail, brisket, ox's head or ox bones by slow simmering on a low flame. The broth tends to have a milky color with a rich and hearty taste.

Varieties

Regional
Hyeonpung gomtang : from the region of Hyeonpung. Broth is made from ox tail, brisket, cow's feet and innards.
Naju gomtang : from the region of Naju. Cooked heel meat and brisket are added to the broth.

By ingredients
Sagol gomtang (사골곰탕) : beef leg bones are the main ingredients
Kkori-gomtang (꼬리곰탕) : ox tail soup
Toran gomtang (토란곰탕) : beef brisket based with toran
Seolleongtang (설렁탕): ox leg bone soup simmered for more than 10 hours until the soup is milky-white. Usually served in a bowl containing somyeon (thin wheat flour noodles) and pieces of beef. Sliced scallions and black pepper are used as condiments. Sometimes served with rice instead of noodles.
Galbi-tang (갈비탕) : made with galbi (beef short ribs)
Yukgaejang (육개장) : gomtang with additional spicy seasoning
Doganitang (도가니탕) : beef knee cartilage is an additional ingredient
Chupotang (추포탕) : finely ground perilla is added

Not beef-based

Gamulchi gomtang : made from snakehead fish with glutinous rice, ginger, ginseng and jujubes
Samgyetang (삼계탕): based with chicken stuffed with ginseng, glutinous rice, jujubes, garlic, and chestnuts
Gamjatang (감자탕): a spicy soup made with separated pork spine, potatoes and hot peppers.
Jumunjin mulgomtang (주문진 물곰탕) : from the region of Jumunjin. Made from moray eel, kimchi and spring onions

See also
Jjigae
Jeongol
 List of soups

References

External links
Soups and stews from Food in Korea
Kkori gomtang recipe at Korean Recipes
Korean Food: Gomtang

Korean words and phrases